

Events 
 Philippe de Monte becomes Kapellmeister for the Habsburg Emperor Maximilian II.
 Second recorded Eisteddfod, at Caerwys in Wales.
Antonio Scandello becomes Kapellmeister at the court of the Electors of Saxony in Dresden.
Girolamo Dalla Casa and his two brothers are hired as musicians at St Mark's Basilica, Venice.

Publications 
Giovanni Animuccia –  (Rome: Valerio and Luigi Dorico)
Joachim a Burck –  (Wittenberg: Johann Schwertel)
Maddalena Casulana – First book of madrigals for four voices (Venice: Girolamo Scotto), the first printed book of music by a woman in history.
Pierre Certon –  for four voices (Paris: Nicolas Du Chemin)
Baldassare Donato – Second book of madrigals for four voices (Venice: Antonio Gardano)
Vincenzo Galilei –  (Venice: Girolamo Scotto), an instructional book for playing, composing and arranging vocal music for lute.
Paolo Isnardi
Masses for five voices (Venice: Angelo Gardano)
First book of madrigals for five voices (Venice: Antonio Gardano)
Orlande de Lassus –  for four, five, six, and more voices (Nuremberg: Theodor Gerlach)
Claudio Merulo – , book four (Venice), a collection of masses arranged for organ
Francesco Portinaro
 for six voices (Venice: Girolamo Scotto)
Second book of motets for six, seven, and eight voices (Venice: Antonio Gardano)
Cipriano de Rore 
, a posthumous collection of madrigals
, posthumous second, expanded edition (first edition: 1566)

Classical music

Births 
February 29 – Juan Bautista Comes, composer (died 1643)
September 3 – Adriano Banchieri, Italian composer (died 1634)
date unknown – Christian Erbach, organist and composer (died 1635)

Deaths 
June 5 – Lamoral, Count of Egmont, subject of Goethe's play and Beethoven's overture (born 1522; executed)
October 14 – Jacques Arcadelt, Flemish composer (born 1514/1515)
November 12 – Georg Forster, composer (born 1510)

 
Music
16th century in music
Music by year